WAYA (100.9 FM) is a radio station broadcasting a Contemporary Christian format. Licensed to Ridgeville, South Carolina, United States, it serves the Charleston SC area. The station is an owned-and-operated station of the WAY-FM Network.

History
The 100.9 frequency used to be in Walterboro, South Carolina. William Saunders owned WPAL, an AM station at 730. In 1994, Saunders bought the FM frequency and moved it to Charleston, changing to urban adult contemporary, with the letters WPAL-FM.

References

External links

Radio stations established in 1968
1968 establishments in South Carolina
WAY-FM Network
AYA-FM